Whendee Silver is an American ecosystem ecologist and biogeochemist.

Early life and education 
Silver grew up in Southern California. She earned her MS in Forest Science from Yale School of Forestry in 1987 and in 1992, received her PhD from Yale University.

Career and research 
Silver is a professor of ecosystem ecology at University of California, Berkeley. With a focus on ecosystem ecology and biogeochemistry, her research is often aimed at better understanding the soil system to mitigate the effects of climate change. A significant portion of her work has focused on tropical ecosystems, their soils, plants, and how nutrients and carbon cycle through them. 

Silver is the lead scientist at the Marin Carbon Project, which she helped found in 2008. The Marin Carbon Project uses science to improve land management, to think about the whole system and thus consider and value ecosystem services such as soil's C sequestration ability,  and make farm and ranch management more centered around carbon sequestration. Through this project she is working with ranchers, using compost for carbon sequestration on ranch land in California, greatly improving the soil's ability to sequester carbon.

Awards and honors 

 Aldo Leopold Leadership Fellow, 2009. 
 Google Science Communication Fellow, 2011. 
 Innovation Award from the American Carbon Registry, 2015. 
 UC Berkeley Faculty Climate Action Champion, 2015-2016. 
 Fellow of the Ecological Society of America, 2016.
ESPM Distinguished Faculty Lecturer, 2017
Fellow, American Geophysical Union, 2021

Publications 
Silver's research on the biogeochemistry of tropical plants has been published in multiple academic journals. Silver's research was featured in the book Physiological Ecology of Tropical Plants by Ulrich Lüttge. Silver has over 145 publications as of 2018.

Selected publications 

 Mayer, A., Z. Hausfather, A. D. Jones, and W. L. Silver. 2018. The Potential of Agricultural Land Management to Contribute to Lower Global Surface Temperatures. Sciences Advances. In Press.
 O’Connell, C., L. Ruan, and W.L. Silver. 2018. Drought drives rapid shifts in tropical rainforest soil biogeochemistry and greenhouse gas emissions. Nature Communications DOI: 10.1038/s41467-018-03352-3.
 Yang, W.H., R. Ryals, D.F. Cusack, and W.L. Silver. 2017. Cross-biome assessment of gross soil nitrogen cycling in California ecosystems. Soil Biology and Biochemistry107:144-155.
 McNicol, G., C.S. Sturtevant, S.H. Knox, I. Dronova, D.D. Baldocchi, and W. L.Silver. 2017. Effects of seasonality, transport-pathway, and spatial structure on restored wetland greenhouse gas fluxes. Global Change Biology DOI: 10.1111/gcb.13580.
 Ryals, R., V. T. Eviner, C. Stein, K. N. Suding, and W. L. Silver. 2016. Managing for multiple ecosystem services: are there tradeoffs between carbon sequestration, plant production and plant diversity in grasslands amended with compost? Ecosphere doi: 10.1002/ecs2.1270.
 Hall, S. J., J. Treffkorn, and W. L. Silver. 2014. Breaking the enzymatic latch: Impacts of reducing conditions on hydrolytic enzyme activity in tropical forest soils. Ecology95: 2964-2973.
 Liptzin, D. and W. L. Silver. 2015. Spatial patterns in oxygen and redox sensitive biogeochemistry in tropical forest soils. Ecosphere6: 1-14.
 Silver, W. L., S. J. Hall, and G. González. 2014. Differential effects of canopy trimming and litter deposition on litterfall and nutrient dynamics in a wet subtropical forest. Forest Ecology and Management332: 47-55.

References 

American ecologists
Women ecologists
Biosequestration
University of California, Berkeley College of Natural Resources faculty
Year of birth missing (living people)
Living people
Yale School of Forestry & Environmental Studies alumni